León Sánchez (born 11 March 1905, date of death unknown) was a Uruguayan rower. He competed in the men's coxed four at the 1936 Summer Olympics.

References

1905 births
Year of death missing
Uruguayan male rowers
Olympic rowers of Uruguay
Rowers at the 1936 Summer Olympics
Place of birth missing